Batesburg-Leesville is a town located in Lexington and Saluda counties, South Carolina, United States. The town's population was 5,362 as of the 2010 census and an estimated 5,415 in 2019.

History
The town of Batesburg-Leesville was formed in 1992 by the consolidation of the neighboring towns of Batesburg and Leesville. Batesburg was "named for Captain Tom Bates, a prominent citizen of the community and a captain in The American Civil War." Leesville was "named for Colonel John W. Lee, a prominent resident of the community."

The D. D. D. Barr House, Batesburg Commercial Historic District, Simon Bouknight House, Cartledge House, Cedar Grove Lutheran Church, Church Street Historic District, Broadus Edwards House, Hampton Hendrix Office, Hartley House, Henry Franklin Hendrix House, Thomas Galbraith Herbert House, J.B. Holman House, A.C. Jones House, Leesville College Historic District, Crowell Mitchell House, McKendree Mitchell House, Mitchell-Shealy House, Old Batesburg Grade School, John Jacob Rawl House, Rawl-Couch House, Southern Railway Depot, and Rev. Frank Yarborough House are listed on the National Register of Historic Places.

In February 1946, Sergeant Isaac Woodard, a black World War II veteran, was removed from a bus in Batesburg and severely beaten by local police officers, including Chief Lynwood Shull. The assault left Woodard completely and permanently blind. Woodard was traveling home by Greyhound bus after being honorably discharged from Camp Gordon in Augusta, Georgia, the bus driver having reported Woodard to local police in Batesburg-Leesville after a verbal argument between the two. Due to South Carolina's reluctance to pursue the case, President Harry S. Truman ordered a federal investigation. The sheriff, Lynwood Shull, was indicted and went to trial in federal court in South Carolina, where he was acquitted by an all-white jury. Such miscarriages of justice by state governments influenced a move towards civil rights initiatives at the federal level. Truman subsequently established a national interracial commission, made a historic speech to the NAACP and the nation in June 1947 in which he described civil rights as a moral priority, submitted a civil rights bill to Congress in February 1948, and issued Executive Orders 9980 and 9981 on June 26, 1948, desegregating the armed forces and the federal government. The attack was the subject of radio commentaries by Orson Welles in July and August 1946.

In early 2018, the town of Batesburg-Leesville, with Town Attorney Christian Spradley, Police Chief W. Wallace Oswald, and Mayor Lancer Shull (no relation to Linwood Shull ), reopened the Woodard case to consider dismissing the 1946 charges. During a regular term of municipal court on June 5, 2018, the Woodard case was reopened and the charges were dismissed by Town Judge Robert Cook. A permanent historic plaque now stands on the corner of West Church Street and Fulmer Street in old Batesburg commemorating the civil rights incident at the site of the original police station.

Law and government
Batesburg-Leesville is served by a council-manager style government. The town employs approximate 60 full-time employees, and 35 volunteer firefighters. The town operated from a $7.4 million budget in Fiscal Year 2018-2019.

Mayor
Batesburg-Leesville's mayor is Lancer Shull.

Town council
The town council comprises eight elected council persons representing single-member districts. The current council members are:
District 1: Barbara Brown
District 2: Olin Gambrell
District 3: Steve Cain
District 4: Johnnie Mae Speech-Lemon
District 5: Shirley E. Mitchell
District 6: Paul Wise
District 7: Jason Prouse
District 8: Bob Hall

Administration
William Theodore "Ted" Luckadoo is the town manager and oversees the day-to-day administrative functions of the town. Luckadoo was named the third town manager of consolidated Batesburg-Leesville in 2014. Jason "Jay" Hendrix was named the assistant town manager on August 8, 2019.

Fire department
The Batesburg-Leesville Fire Department consists of two stations, five career staff members and 41 volunteer firefighters as of September 2019. The two stations are located in the town's two historic business districts and are still identified as the Batesburg station and the Leesville station. The department boasts an Insurance Services Office Class 3/3B rating.

Fire Chief: Josh Frye
Assistant Chief: Shane Summer
Assistant Chief: John Gall
Captain: Bobby Hallman
Lieutenant: Chris Hallman
Lieutenant: Dustin Crapps
Training Officers: Jason Herbert and Davey Taylor

Economy

Top employers
The top employer in Batesburg-Leesville is Lexington County School District Three with four different schools and a district office. The next is Ansaldo STS, which has a  manufacturing facility.

Poultry industry
The town's economic dependence on poultry harvesting is apparent due to the presence of two large processing plants: Amick Farms and Columbia Farms. These assist in making Lexington County the top poultry producer in the state.

Poultry festival
The South Carolina Poultry Festival (formerly the Ridge Poultry Festival) has been held on the second Saturday in May since 1987. The festival features live music, food vendors, craft vendors, a carnival, a parade, and to conclude the event a cake auction and fireworks show.

Education

Public schools
The public school system in Batesburg-Leesville is administered by Lexington County School District Three, which consists of:
Batesburg-Leesville Primary School  (grades K-2)
Batesburg-Leesville Elementary School (grades 3-5) 
Batesburg-Leesville Middle School (grades 6-8) 
Batesburg-Leesville High School (grades 9-12)

All sports teams associated with School District Three use a panther as their mascot. The Panthers' colors are purple, gold, and black

Historic public schools
The Batesburg-Leesville Primary School opened in 1984. At that time the district began operating just four schools, as they consolidated smaller, older schools into the new school. Historical schools which closed in 1984 included Hampton Elementary School (1954), Utopia Elementary School (1953), Leesville Elementary School and Batesburg Primary School.

The Batesburg-Leesville Elementary School opened 1996 and replaced the Old Batesburg Grade School  which had served the fourth and fifth grades and now serves as the Lexington School District Three Administrative Office. The new school allowed third grade to be shifted from the B-L Primary School to the new Elementary School give the current school breakdown by grade.

The Batesburg-Leesville Middle School opened in 1999. This led to the closing of the old middle school campus which had originally been built as Batesburg-Leesville High School in 1921 with numerous additions through the years.

The Batesburg-Leesville High School opened in 1975. The new school was built on the former Summerland College campus on Summerland Avenue. The construction of a new school had been spurred by integration and student population increases. With integration a former building of Summerland College was used as a middle school in the early 1970s but a fire heavily damaged the building and eventually sped up the construction of the new high school. The first class to graduate in Panther Stadium was the class of 1976.

Prior to racial integration statewide, the local African-American students attended Twin-City High School and Hampton School. Twin-City High School was located on Maple Street in Batesburg where the Twin-City High School Park is now located. The park is owned by the Twin-City Alumni Association. The original two-story wooden Hampton School (1922) was replaced in 1954 by a single story brick structure on South Lee Street in Leesville. The original wooden building was subsequently torn down, but a marker remains under a large tree in the parking lot of Friendship Baptist Church on South Lee Street. Other "colored" schools included Leesville Colored Primary School and Batesburg-Saluda Colored School.

There were other older schools which had closed previously to include Delmar School which was located a few miles outside of town. More photographs of these old school buildings may be seen at SC School Insurance Photos 1935-50.

Private schools
W. Wyman King Academy and the Ridge Christian School are private, nondenominational Christian schools accepting students in grades K-12.

Colleges and universities
In 2008, Midlands Technical College opened a new Batesburg-Leesville satellite campus in the Leesville Historic District. The campus is within the boundaries of the Leesville College Park at the intersection of Main Street and College Street.

Historic colleges

Leesville College, 1890-1911, originally called the Leesville English and Classical Institute (1881-1890). The Haynes Auditorium (built 1883) in the Leesville College Historic District at the intersection of Main Street and College Street was the original classroom building. Two neighboring houses were the college President's House and Dormitory. The two homes were a single building during the college days and known as Salisto Hall (a modifier combining the name of two neighboring rivers, Saluda and Edisto). The school was said to have been the first in the state to include practical and technical training in its curriculum, to have a girls' basketball team, to teach tennis and to teach higher mathematics to females. A.B. degrees were granted after four years of Latin, two years of French or German, mathematics, natural science, history, English, philosophy, and Greek. A Master's Degree was offered for a year of post-graduate work. There were departments of music, arts, commercial law, bookkeeping, typing, and one devoted to the Pitman system of shorthand.
Summerland College, 1912-30. Originally known as Summerland Resort, this property was converted to an all-female college of the Lutheran Church in 1912. It was located on the site of the current Batesburg-Leesville High School. It was closed after the 1930 school year and then consolidated with the all-male Newberry College.

Library
Batesburg-Leesville has a public library, a branch of the Lexington County Public Library.

Media

Newspapers
Batesburg-Leesville is served weekly by The Twin-City News, which specifically focuses on local news, as well as that from immediately surrounding areas (mostly Gilbert and Monetta). It minimizes national or world news. The Twin-City News was established in 1925 and is Batesburg-Leesville's oldest continuously-operating business.

The town is also served by The State newspaper, which circulates amid most of the state.

In 2007, Lexington County Chronicle and The Dispatch-News began appearing at town stores and business to complement their subscribers in the area. This newspaper covers all county governments, state, national, and international news, to the extent such news concerns Lexington County residents.

Radio
Batesburg-Leesville has only one radio station transmitting from within its borders, WBLR 1430 AM. However, Batesburg-Leesville is in range of several radio stations broadcasting from the surrounding areas, including:
WBLR 1430 AM - Spanish Christian - Batesburg-Leesville, SC (simulcast on 103.3 FM Batesburg-Leesville, SC)
WYFV 88.7 FM - Christian - Cayce, SC
WMHK 89.7 FM - Christian - Columbia, SC
WUSC 90.5 FM - University of South Carolina - Columbia, SC
WLTR 91.3 FM - Classical/NPR - Columbia, SC
WLFW 92.7 FM - Southern Gospel - Johnston, SC
WZMJ 93.1 FM - All-Time Favorites - Lexington, SC 
WARQ 93.5 FM - New Rock - Columbia, SC
WUDE 94.3 FM - Country - Columbia, SC
WLTY 96.7 FM - Variety - Columbia, SC 
WCOS 97.5 FM - Country - Columbia, SC
WLXC 98.5 FM - R&B/Soul - Lexington, SC
WWDM 101.3 FM - R&B/Soul - Columbia, SC
WBBQ 104.3 FM - "Top 40" - Augusta, GA
WNOK 104.7 FM - "Top 40" - Columbia, SC
WEKL 105.7 FM - Classic rock - Augusta, GA
WTCB 106.7 FM - "Top 40" - Columbia, SC
WNKT 107.5 FM - Sports Talk - Columbia, SC

Television
Over-the-air channels receivable in Batesburg-Leesville include:
WJBF - Channel 6 - Augusta, GA
WRDW-TV - Channel 12 - Augusta, GA
WOLO-TV - Channel 25 (ABC Affiliate) - Columbia, SC
WFXG - Channel 54 - Augusta, GA
WLTX - Channel 19 (CBS Affiliate) - Columbia, SC
WACH - Channel 57 (Fox Affiliate) - Columbia, SC
WIS-TV - Channel 10 (NBC Affiliate) - Columbia, SC
WRLK-TV - Channel 35 - Columbia, SC

Alternatively, digital cable providers Time Warner Cable and Pond Branch Telecommunications collectively cover the majority of the greater Batesburg-Leesville area.

Geography
Batesburg-Leesville is located in western Lexington County at  (33.909767, -81.534296). A small portion of the town extends west into Saluda County.

Batesburg-Leesville is located along the Atlantic Seaboard Fall Line which separates the Piedmont region from the Atlantic coastal plain. Historically, U.S. Route 1 followed this line, and it presently separates the north and south sides of the duel town. Typically in this vicinity, the Piedmont area has a clay soil surface, while the Coastal Plain is sandy.

Demographics

2020 census

As of the 2020 United States census, there were 5,270 people, 2,046 households, and 1,458 families residing in the town.

2000 census
As of the U.S. Census of 2000, there were 5,517 people, 2,167 households, and 1,482 families residing in the town. The population density was 751.4 people per square mile (290.2/km2). There were 2,446 housing units at an average density of 333.2 per square mile (128.7/km2).

The racial makeup of the town was 52.82% White, 45.66% African American, 0.29% Native American, 0.20% Asian, 0.40% from other races, and 0.63% from two or more races. Hispanic or Latino of any race were 1.61% of the local population.

There were 2,167 households, of which 31.2% had children under the age of 18 living with them, 42.0% were married couples living together, 22.2% had a female householder with no husband present, and 31.6% were non-families. 28.3% of all households were made up of individuals, and 13.7% had someone living alone who was 65 years of age or older. The average household size was 2.50, and the average family size was 3.03.

In the town, the population was spread out, with 26.5% under the age of 18, 8.4% from 18 to 24, 25.2% from 25 to 44, 22.6% from 45 to 64, and 17.3% who were 65 years of age or older. The median age was 38 years. For every 100 females, there were 83.3 males. For every 100 females age 18 and over, there were 76.5 males.

The median income for a household in the town was $32,865, and the median income for a family was $40,040. Males had a median income of $32,447 versus $22,196 for females. The per capita income for the town was $16,078. About 16.1% of families and 18.0% of the population were below the poverty line, including 25.9% of those under age 18 and 12.5% of those age 65 or over.

Notable people
Notable figures who were born in, lived in, or are otherwise associated with Batesburg-Leesville include:

Athletes
Shaq Roland, South Carolina University a wide receiver for South Carolina Gamecocks
Dontrelle Inman, a professional football player for the San Diego Chargers, Chicago Bears and Toronto Argonauts
Ed McDaniel, a former professional football player for Minnesota Vikings from 1992 to 2001
Zackary Bowman, a professional football player for the Chicago Bears, New York Giants, Miami Dolphins from 2008 to 2015.
Maurice Simpkins, a professional football player for the Green Bay Packers in 2010
Dal Shealy, college football player and coach

Musicians
Linda Martell (born Thelma Bynem in Leesville), was an American rhythm and blues and country music singer.

Governmental and Military
Katrina F. Shealy, has been a South Carolina State Senator since 2013 following her election in November, 2012. Upon assuming office, she became the sole female in the State Senate. Shealy, a Republican, is from Lexington County was born in Leesville and is a graduate of Batesburg-Leesville High School. 
Ryan C. Shealy, a Democratic state legislator in Columbia who served in the South Carolina House of Representatives from 1954 to 1970, and in the South Carolina Senate from 1980 to 1982. He was born in Leesville.
George Bell Timmerman Jr., served as Governor of South Carolina from 1955 to 1959, a Southern Democrat leading the state during a period of growing racial strife. Fritz Hollings served as his lieutenant governor and would succeed him as Governor. From 1947 to 1955 he had served as a lieutenant governor under Democrats Strom Thurmond and James F. Byrnes. A Graduate of The Citadel, The Military College of South Carolina, Class of 1934 and the University of South Carolina School of Law in 1937. He would later serve in the United States Navy during World War II. Served as a judge in South Carolina's Eleventh Judicial Circuit from 1967 until 1984. Although born in Anderson County, he was reared and lived in Batesburg until his death on November 29, 1994 and is buried in Batesburg Cemetery.
Clabie Cecil Edmond, the first African-American Mayor, from 1997 - 2001. He was an alumnus of the South Carolina Mayors’ Institute for Community Design class of 2000. Clabie, served the town in various capacities; which began in 1984 as a member of the Leesville Town Council, then for five more years on the consolidated council of Batesburg-Leesville. Clabie was a devoted resident of the town until his death on March 25, 2021. His body was laid to rest at his church with Marine military honors on March 29, 2021 at Wesley Chapel C.M.E. Church.
Col. Werner Watson Moore, Prior to and during World War II, he was Chief of the War Department's Shipbuilding program, then Chief of Transportation for the Caribbean and Pacific Theater. Post war, he was Chief of the Special Office charged with the conversion of a massive fleet to peacetime use. Finally, he served as Commanding Officer, New Orleans Port of Embarkation prior to his retirement in 1955. He was a native of Leesville born in 1893, and a descendant of notable local Revolutionary War patriot, Captain Michael Watson, as well as several other local old families. He died in Metairie, LA in 1980 and is buried in Arlington National Cemetery with his son, Cpl. Werner Watson Moore. Jr. who was killed in action in Germany in 1945 (for which he received a Purple Heart).

References

External links

Towns in South Carolina
Towns in Lexington County, South Carolina
Towns in Saluda County, South Carolina
Columbia metropolitan area (South Carolina)